Hamilton Branch is a census-designated place (CDP) in Plumas County, California, United States. The population was 587 at the 2000 census.

Geography
Hamilton Branch is located at  (40.274001, -121.095899), on the north-east shore of Lake Almanor.

Demographics

2010
At the 2010 census Hamilton Branch had a population of 537. The racial makeup of Hamilton Branch was 514 (95.7%) White, 2 (0.4%) African American, 0 (0.0%) Native American, 3 (0.6%) Asian, 0 (0.0%) Pacific Islander, 3 (0.6%) from other races, and 15 (2.8%) from two or more races. Hispanic or Latino of any race were 20 people (3.7%).

The whole population lived in households, no one lived in non-institutionalized group quarters and no one was institutionalized.

There were 234 households, 50 (21.4%) had children under the age of 18 living in them, 146 (62.4%) were opposite-sex married couples living together, 7 (3.0%) had a female householder with no husband present, 9 (3.8%) had a male householder with no wife present.  There were 15 (6.4%) unmarried opposite-sex partnerships, and 2 (0.9%) same-sex married couples or partnerships. 58 households (24.8%) were one person and 27 (11.5%) had someone living alone who was 65 or older. The average household size was 2.29.  There were 162 families (69.2% of households); the average family size was 2.72.

The age distribution was 105 people (19.6%) under the age of 18, 27 people (5.0%) aged 18 to 24, 78 people (14.5%) aged 25 to 44, 187 people (34.8%) aged 45 to 64, and 140 people (26.1%) who were 65 or older.  The median age was 52.3 years. For every 100 females, there were 106.5 males.  For every 100 females age 18 and over, there were 101.9 males.

There were 434 housing units at an average density of 399.9 per square mile, of the occupied units 201 (85.9%) were owner-occupied and 33 (14.1%) were rented. The homeowner vacancy rate was 2.9%; the rental vacancy rate was 19.5%.  446 people (83.1% of the population) lived in owner-occupied housing units and 91 people (16.9%) lived in rental housing units.

2000
At the 2000 census there were 587 people, 251 households, and 190 families in the CDP. The racial makeup of the CDP was 97.27% White, 0.17% Native American, 0.17% Asian, 1.53% from other races, and 0.85% from two or more races.  4.77% of the population were Hispanic or Latino of any race.
Of the 251 households 20.7% had children under the age of 18 living with them, 68.5% were married couples living together, 2.8% had a female householder with no husband present, and 24.3% were non-families. 18.7% of households were one person and 6.8% were one person aged 65 or older.  The average household size was 2.34 and the average family size was 2.63.

The age distribution was 18.7% under the age of 18, 4.8% from 18 to 24, 20.3% from 25 to 44, 35.6% from 45 to 64, and 20.6% 65 or older.  The median age was 49 years. For every 100 females, there were 110.4 males.  For every 100 females age 18 and over, there were 105.6 males.

The median household income was $49,083 and the median family income  was $49,917. Males had a median income of $50,057 versus $31,000 for females. The per capita income for the CDP was $23,051.  About 10.4% of families and 16.4% of the population were below the poverty line, including 38.6% of those under age 18 and none of those age 65 or over.

Politics

References

Census-designated places in Plumas County, California
Census-designated places in California